Waz may refer to:
Waz, Iran (disambiguation), places in Iran
WAZ-Mediengruppe, German newspaper and magazine publisher
Wąż, a Polish coat of arms
WΔZ, a 2007 crime/horror film starring Stellan Skarsgård, Melissa George, Ashley Walters, and Selma Blair
Westdeutsche Allgemeine Zeitung, a German newspaper
Worked All Zones, an amateur radio operating award
Warwick Airport (Queensland), IATA airport code "WAZ"